William Jewell College is a private liberal arts college in Liberty, Missouri. It was founded in 1849 by members of the Missouri Baptist Convention and endowed with $10,000 by William Jewell. It was associated with the Missouri Baptist Convention for over 150 years until its separation in 2003 and is now an independent institution. Since becoming a nonsectarian institution, the college's enrollment has fallen by approximately 40% to 739 students in 2018.  Jewell is accredited by the Higher Learning Commission.

History

Founding

The college is named after Dr. William Jewell, who in 1849 donated $10,000 to start a school. Jewell, who was from Columbia, Missouri, had wanted the school built in Boonville, Missouri. However, Liberty resident Alexander William Doniphan argued that donated undeveloped land in Liberty would be more valuable than the proposed developed land in Boonville, and Liberty was eventually chosen. Judge James Turner Vance Thompson donated the hilltop land on which the campus sits. In the American Civil War during the Battle of Liberty, the main building on campus, Jewell Hall, was used as a hospital, infirmary, and stables for the United States Army. Union troops were buried on the campus. It was listed on the National Register of Historic Places in 1978. The Mt. Memorial Cemetery, listed on the National Register of Historic Places in 2012, is located on the campus grounds.

Gano Chapel

In 1926, the John Gano chapel was built, based on a donation from Gano's great-granddaughter Elizabeth Price, who lived in Kansas City. Price gave the money for the chapel with provisions that the chapel be named for Gano and that it hang a painting of Gano baptizing George Washington in the Potomac River during the American Revolutionary War. The college says the painting is one of the school's most popular tourist destinations and takes no stance on whether the baptism of Washington (who was an Episcopalian) actually took place.

Harriman-Jewell Series
The Harriman-Jewell Series, a performing arts series, was founded in 1965 by Department of English Professors Dean Dunham and Richard Harriman. Harriman was especially instrumental in bringing Luciano Pavarotti to campus, where the tenor made his international solo recital debut as part of the Series in 1973. Today, the Series continues to bring world-class music, dance and theatre events to Kansas City. The 2014–2015 season marked the Series' 50th anniversary.

Jewell students receive free tickets to Harriman-Jewell Series events, further shaping their liberal arts experience. Events are primarily held in downtown Kansas City at the Kauffman Center for the Performing Arts and the Folly Theater.

Pryor Learning Commons
In August 2013, William Jewell College opened Pryor Learning Commons, a 26,000 square-foot intellectual center where students gather, learn, and create 24 hours a day. The three-story hub of campus allows for students to work as mature, independent learners, immersing and engaging in their educational experience.

Equipped with innovation studios, recording and editing suites, a 3D printer, 80" touchscreens, configurable white board tables, AirMedia, live Twitter wall, coffee shop, and more, the fully donor-funded $15 million Pryor Learning Commons lends itself to the learning styles of today's students.

Sexual assault allegations
In May 2019 the college was named in a lawsuit filed by a former student who was raped in Browning Hall in 2017 by another student, a member of the college's football team. The Clay County prosecutor did not pursue the matter with criminal charges. The victim alleges that after the reporting of the incident she continued to be harassed by the perpetrator and members of the football team. While the college does not deny that the rape occurred,
 the college's response in June 2019 denied any responsibility and petitioned the court to dismiss the lawsuit.

Academics

The college offers nearly 40 academic majors and 10 pre-professional programs.

William Jewell College also provides an Oxbridge Honors Program. Oxbridge majors take tutorials in their major, study abroad in Oxford, and take comprehensive exams during their senior year. The college offers a Journey Grant program in which students can qualify for a minimum $2,000 grant to use their junior year of school to help create an educational experience like study abroad, leadership and service projects, internships, research, business projects, etc.

In 2019, William Jewell started the Honors Institute in Critical Thinking, a scholarship honors program that delves into analytical thinking with a self-designed practicum centered around a world issue.

Since 2013, the college claimed three Fulbright Scholars, two Goldwater Scholars, one Rhodes Global Scholar international finalist, two Truman Scholar finalists, one Rotary International Scholarship and ten Teach For America corps members.

The college offers three graduate programs, all approved by the Higher Learning Commission: The Master of Arts in Teaching, the Master of Science in Curriculum and Instruction, and the Artist Diploma in Voice (certificate program).

Athletics 

The William Jewell athletic teams are called the Cardinals. The college is a member of the NCAA Division II ranks, primarily competing in the Great Lakes Valley Conference (GLVC) since the 2011–12 academic year. Prior to joining the NCAA, the Cardinals previously competed in the Heart of America Conference (HAAC) of the National Association of Intercollegiate Athletics (NAIA) from 1971–72 to 2010–11; and in the Missouri College Athletic Union (MCAU) from 1924–25 to 1970–71.

William Jewell competes in 25 intercollegiate varsity sports: Men's sports include baseball, basketball, cross country, football, golf, lacrosse, quadball, soccer, swimming, tennis, track & field and wrestling; while women's sports include basketball, cross country, golf, lacrosse, soccer, softball, swimming, tennis, track & field, volleyball and wrestling; and co-ed sports include athletic band, powerlifting and spirit team.

Greek life

Fraternities 
  Kappa Alpha Order – Alpha Delta chapter
  Lambda Chi Alpha – Epsilon-Nu chapter
  Phi Gamma Delta (FIJI) – Zeta Phi chapter

Sororities 
  Alpha Gamma Delta – Epsilon Epsilon chapter
  Delta Zeta – Zeta Rho chapter
  Zeta Tau Alpha – Delta Chi Chapter

Notable alumni

 Cyrus Avery (1870–1963), businessman and "Father of Route 66"
 Eugene Monroe Bartlett (1885–1941), Christian singer, songwriter and producer of gospel music.
 Daniel Belcher, Grammy-winning operatic baritone
 Edwin Charles Boulton (A.B., 1950), a bishop of the United Methodist Church
 Nancy Boyda, deputy assistant secretary of defense for manpower and personnel; former Democratic congresswoman from Kansas, 2007–2009
 Hilary A. Bush, (BA 1926) Missouri lieutenant governor
 Greg Canuteson, Former state rep. and Mayor of Liberty
 Robin Carnahan, Missouri Secretary of State, 2005–2013
 Tom Carnegie, (AB 1942), longtime voice of the Indianapolis Motor Speedway and the Indianapolis 500 car race as track announcer from 1946 to 2006.
 Chris Cissell (A.B., 1994), Current head coach of women's soccer at University of Missouri Kansas City. Former head coach of men's soccer & women's soccer at William Jewell College. NSCAA/adidas NAIA Men's National Coach of the Year in 2006.
 Russ Cline, co-founder of Eagle Pro Box Lacrosse League (now called National Lacrosse League), owner of Philadelphia Wings
 Earl Thomas Coleman, Republican congressman from Missouri, 1977–1993
 Jim Davis, actor, portrayed Jock Ewing on "Dallas" TV series
 Connie Dover, Celtic and American music folk singer, songwriter
 Homer Drew, head basketball coach at Valparaiso University
 Zel Fischer, Missouri Supreme Court Judge
 James B. Graham, former Kentucky Auditor of Public Accounts and former Kentucky Superintendent of Public Instruction
William Hardin Harrison, US Army general
 Larry Holley, former basketball coach at Central Methodist University and Northwest Missouri State University and former head coach at William Jewell College. Has the ninth most wins in college basketball. 
 James J. Jenkins American psychologist
 Brian Knight Major League Baseball Umpire since 2011
  Dan Lanning, Head football coach, University of Oregon
 Gatewood Lincoln, 19th and 22nd Governor of American Samoa (only attended, did not graduate) 
 Don Page, theoretical physicist
 David Ring, motivational speaker with cerebral palsy
 Roy Sanders, former professional baseball player
 Bill Snyder (A.B., 1962), head American football coach for Kansas State University, 1989–2005; 2009–2018
 Josephine L. Staton, United States federal district judge on the United States District Court for the Central District of California
 Orvar Swenson (1933), pediatric surgeon
 Terry Teachout, biographer, playwright, opera librettist, drama critic for the Wall Street Journal, and critic-at-large of Commentary
 JD Gravina (B.S. 2000), Head Women's Basketball Coach at Western Illinois University

References

External links
 
 William & Jewell athletics website

 
Liberal arts colleges in Missouri
Educational institutions established in 1849
Buildings and structures in Clay County, Missouri
Education in Clay County, Missouri
1849 establishments in Missouri
Liberty, Missouri
Private universities and colleges in Missouri